The YTO Group Corporation is a Chinese agricultural machinery and construction machinery manufacturer part of Sinomach, a comprehensive machinery conglomerate. Although composed of many subsidiaries and divisions, the company is best known for manufacturing a range of farming products including tractors and combine harvesters. The company was founded in 1955 and become the largest manufacturer of tractors in China. The company also manufactures construction machinery trucks and diesel engines.

History
Prior to using the YTO brand, the tractors and engines were marketed under the brand Dongfanghong (DFH). In the 1980s and 1990s, Fiat began to assist First Tractor Company with technology for engines and tractors.

In 2005, AGCO announced they were in discussions with First Tractor Company to establish a joint venture to manufacture tractors between 40 and 100 horsepower although the joint venture never materialized.

The company has been keen on making a presence in international markets through establishing overseas factories and sales networks. In March 2013, the company scored a large export order when Ethiopia purchased $100 million worth of tractors.

Products
 Agricultural Machinery
 Wheeled Tractor
 Crawler Tractor
 Combine Harvester
 Implement & Attachment
 Construction Machinery
 Road Roller
 Wheeled Loader
 Motor Grader
 Crawler Excavator
 Bulldozer
 Forklift Truck
 Garbage Compactor
 Road Paver
 Road Recycler
 Concrete Mixing Plant
 Asphalt Mixing Plant
 Drilling Rig
 Mobile Power Station
 Vehicle
 Mining Dump Truck
 Pickup Truck
 Special purpose Vehicles
 Diesel Engine & OEM Parts
 Diesel Engine
 OEM Parts

Models

Agricultural Tractors

YTO Brand

Dongfanghong Brand

Harvesters

Combine Harvesters

Corn Pickers

Construction Machinery

Motor Graders
 MG1217A
 MG1320E
 PY165C-2
 PY180C-2
 PY185A
 PY200TF
 PY220C-2

Wheel Loaders
 ZL18H - Cummins engine
 ZL30F - Weichai engine
 ZL30-II - YTO engine
 ZL30H - Cummins engine
 ZL40H - Cummins engine
 ZL50D-II - Cummins or Shanghai engine
 ZL50F - Weichai engine
 ZL50H - Cummins engine
 ZL60H - Cummins engine
 ZL75H - Cummins engine
 ZLM30-5
 ZLM40E
 ZLM955

Trucks

 308
 408
 408P
 608
 608C
 608P
 808
 808C
 808P
 828
 828C
 828P
 838
 838C
 838P
 858
 LT1026DP
 LT1036DP28
 LT1036DP33
 LT1026SP
 LT1036SP29
 LT1036SP33
 LT5026DPXXY
 LT5026SPXXY
 LT1022SC1L - pickup
 LT1022SJ1L - pickup
 LT1022SQ1L - pickup
 LT5013ZLJ
 LT5017ZLJ
 LT5023ZLJ
 LT5028ZLJ
 LT5030ZLJ
 LT50488ZZZ
 LT5048GPSE
 LT5080ZYS
 LT5090GPSE
 LT5090ZLJ
 LT5102ZBS
 LT5102ZYS
 LT5108ZLJ
 LT5128GPSE
 LT5142ZYS
 LT5160GPSE
 LT5160ZLJ
 LT5168ZYS

References

External links
 YTO website
 First Tractor/YTO
 RabEng.co.uk Distributor

China National Machinery Industry Corporation
Agricultural machinery manufacturers of China
Tractor manufacturers of China
Truck manufacturers of China
Diesel engine manufacturers
Chinese brands
Companies based in Henan
Chinese companies established in 1955